Arif Mardin (March 15, 1932 – June 25, 2006) was a Turkish-American music producer, who worked with hundreds of artists across many different styles of music, including jazz, rock, soul, disco and country. He worked at Atlantic Records for over 30 years, as producer, arranger, studio manager, and vice president, before moving to EMI and serving as vice president and general manager of Manhattan Records. 

Mardin's collaborations include working with The Rascals, Queen, John Prine, the Bee Gees, Hall & Oates, Anita Baker, Aretha Franklin, Dionne Warwick, Donny Hathaway, Roberta Flack, Bette Midler, Michael Crawford, Chaka Khan, Laura Nyro, Ringo Starr, Carly Simon, Phil Collins, Daniel Rodriguez, and Norah Jones. Mardin was awarded eleven Grammy Awards and has eighteen nominations.

Biography

Early life
Mardin was born in Istanbul into a renowned family that included statesmen, diplomats and leaders in the civic, military and business sectors of the Ottoman Empire and the Turkish Republic. His father was co-owner in a petroleum gas station chain.

Mardin grew up listening to the likes of Bing Crosby and Glenn Miller. Through his sister he met jazz critic Cuneyt Sermet, who turned him onto this music and eventually became his mentor. After graduating from Istanbul University in Economics and Commerce, Mardin studied at the London School of Economics. Influenced by his sister's music records and jazz, he was also an accomplished orchestrator and arranger, but he never intended to pursue a career in music.

However, his fate changed in 1956 after meeting the American jazz musicians Dizzy Gillespie and Quincy Jones at a concert in Ankara. He sent three demo compositions to his friend Tahir Sur who worked at a radio station in America. Sur took these compositions to Quincy Jones and Mardin became the first recipient of the Quincy Jones Scholarship at the Berklee College of Music in Boston. In 1958 he and his fiancé Latife moved from Istanbul to Boston. After graduating in 1961, he taught at Berklee for one year and then moved to New York City to try his luck. Arif Mardin was later made a trustee of Berklee and was awarded an honorary doctorate.

Career

Mardin began his career at Atlantic Records in 1963 as an assistant to Nesuhi Ertegün. A fellow Turkish émigré, Nesuhi was the brother of Ahmet Ertegün, Atlantic's co-founder and a jazz enthusiast when they met at the Newport Jazz Festival. Mardin rose through the ranks quickly, becoming studio manager, label house producer and arranger. In 1969, he became the Vice President and later served as Senior Vice President until 2001. He worked closely on many projects with co-founders Ertegün and Jerry Wexler, as well as noted recording engineer Tom Dowd; the three legends (Dowd, Mardin, and Wexler) were responsible for establishing the "Atlantic Sound". Arif Mardin retired from Atlantic Records in May 2001 and re-activated his label Manhattan Records. He maintained ties to the Turkish music industry.

He produced many hit artists including Margie Joseph, Thereza Bazar, The Rascals, Carly Simon, Petula Clark, Bette Midler, Barbra Streisand, the Bee Gees, Diana Ross, Queen, Patti LaBelle, Aretha Franklin, Lulu, Anita Baker, Judy Collins, Phil Collins, Scritti Politti, Culture Club, Roberta Flack, Average White Band, Hall & Oates, Donny Hathaway, Jeffrey Osborne, Norah Jones, Daniel Rodriguez, Chaka Khan, George Benson, Melissa Manchester, The Manhattan Transfer, Modern Jazz Quartet, Willie Nelson, John Prine, Leo Sayer, Dusty Springfield, David Bowie, Jewel and Ringo Starr.

Mardin is listed on Stephen Stills' first album (1970) issued by Atlantic Records, as a contributing artist for string arrangement on the songs "Church" and "To a Flame".

Arif Mardin, when producing the Bee Gees' 1975 Main Course album track "Nights on Broadway" discovered the distinctive falsetto of Barry Gibb, which became a familiar trademark of the band throughout the disco era.

Mardin made three solo albums: Glass Onion, in 1970, Journey, in 1975, and All My Friends Are Here, in 2006. In Journey, he was the composer and arranger, but he also played electric piano and percussion, and was accompanied by many stars of jazz (Randy and Michael Brecker, Joe Farrell, Gary Burton, Ron Carter, Steve Gadd, Billy Cobham and many others). Mardin composed, arranged, conducted and produced The Prophet, an interpretation of The Prophet by Kahlil Gibran, in 1974, featuring Richard Harris.

In his career of more than 40 years, he collected over 40 gold and platinum albums, over 15 Grammy nominations and 12 Grammy Awards. In 1990, Arif Mardin was inducted into the National Academy of Recording Arts and Sciences Hall of Fame.

All My Friends Are Here
Mardin considered All My Friends Are Here his life's work.  He wrote or co-wrote all but one of the 13 tracks.  The album features performances by Bette Midler, Chaka Khan, David Sanborn, Norah Jones, Carly Simon, Phil Collins, among the artists whom he produced over the years. Recording sessions and interviews were filmed for the companion documentary The Greatest Ears in Town: The Arif Mardin Story.

The Greatest Ears in Town: The Arif Mardin Story 
His son, Joe, created a documentary about his father called The Greatest Ears in Town: The Arif Mardin Story which was released on June 15, 2010. The documentary was directed by Doug Biro. It was premiered at several screenings at different chapters of The Recording Academy. The first screening took place in New York on June 15, 2010.

Awards
 Grammy Awards
Album of the Year 1979 (Saturday Night Fever soundtrack), 2003 (Come Away with Me - Norah Jones)
 Best Female Pop Vocal Performance 1982 ("You Should Hear How She Talks About You" - Melissa Manchester)
 Best Female R&B Vocal Performance 1985 ("I Feel for You" - Chaka Khan)
 Best Album Notes 1993 (Queen of Soul: The Atlantic Recordings- Aretha Franklin)
 Best Jazz Vocal Album 2004 (A Little Moonlight - Dianne Reeves)
 Best Musical Show Album 1996 (Smokey Joe's Cafe)
 Best Pop Vocal Album 2003 (Come Away with Me)
 Best Vocal Arrangement for Two or More Voices 1984 ("Be Bop Medley" with Chaka Khan)
 Producer of the Year, Non-Classical 1976, 2003 (Come Away with Me)
 Record of the Year 1990 ("Wind Beneath My Wings"), 2003 ("Don't Know Why")
 Trustees Award 2002
 Trustee Award for a Lifetime of Achievement in Music by the National Academy of Recording Arts and Sciences (NARAS) 2001
 "Man of the Year" by the Nordoff-Robbins Music Foundation 2001
 Ertegün Impact Award

Personal life
He came to the United States in 1958 with his wife, Latife Mardin, who was a playwright and translator. They had three children: Nazan Joffre, Joe Mardin and Julie Mardin.

Death 
Mardin died at his home in New York on June 25, 2006, following a lengthy battle with pancreatic cancer. His remains were brought to Turkey and were interred at Karacaahmet Cemetery in Üsküdar district of Istanbul on July 5, 2006. Bee Gees' soloist Robin Gibb and his wife Dwina attended the funeral service, among other prominent people.

Ahmet Necdet Sezer, the Turkish president, said in a statement: “I was deeply saddened by the death of Arif Mardin, who is considered to be one of the most important music producers of the 20th century. He will always be respectfully remembered as a person who made our nation proud.”

Ahmet Ertegun, Founder of Atlantic Records and former Chairman of The American Turkish Society remarked  "Arif Mardin has been one of the most prolific board members of The American Turkish Society and a great friend. We are deeply grateful for his service."

A memorial tribute to Mardin was held at Alice Tully Hall in New York City on March 6, 2007.

See also 
 Category: Albums produced by Arif Mardin

References

External links

1932 births
2006 deaths
American music industry executives
Berklee College of Music alumni
Burials at Karacaahmet Cemetery
Deaths from cancer in New York (state)
Deaths from pancreatic cancer
Grammy Award winners
Istanbul University alumni
Musicians from Istanbul
Turkish emigrants to the United States
Turkish record producers